Macau competed at the 2019 World Athletics Championships in Doha, Qatar, from 27 September–6 October 2019.

Result

Women
Track and road events

References 

Nations at the 2019 World Athletics Championships
2019
2019 in Macau sport